Edina Dobi (born ) is a Hungarian female volleyball player, playing as a middle-blocker. She is part of the Hungary women's national volleyball team.

She competed at the 2015 Women's European Volleyball Championship. On club level she plays for Raben Vilsbiburg.

References

External links

1987 births
Living people
People from Eger
Hungarian women's volleyball players